Parramatta West Public School is an educational establishment located in Parramatta, New South Wales, Australia.

There is currently 23 fully established classes, 5 composite classes and 3 special classes

Parramatta West Public School has an extended history in the local community. It first opened as Pitt Row in 1888. Many children at the school are the children and grandchildren of past students. In more recent times, the school has grown to include newer arrivals to Australia and now has over 50 nationalities represented. Support for the school's multicultural community includes a playgroup, a homework centre and parent programs and the convenience of before and after school care on site. Students at Parramatta West are provided with opportunities to excel in sport and the creative arts. Dance, music, choir, drama, drumming and visual arts are areas of excellence. P.W.P.S leadership programs help the students develop important social skills and community values. Parramatta West Public School provides a curriculum in stimulating inclusive classrooms. Assessment for Learning is a tool Parramatta West uses to guide their teaching and to maximise their students' potential.

Curriculum 
Parramatta West follows the Australian National Curriculum. It involves English, Maths, Spelling, Technology, Sport and Writing.

Extra Curricular activities 
The school has many groups, whom most of them listed here
 Recorder Ensemble
 GLEE Club
 Various Choirs
 Strings Ensemble
 Tech Club
 Chinese Group
 Dance Group
Gardening club
Handball club

Location 
It is located to the north of Parramatta next to Pitt St and Auburn St next to the M4.

Technology 
The technology in the school is above mediocre. There is a computer room with iMacs and Desktops. In the classroom there are OLPC XO's and Infinity Ones.

Public primary schools in Sydney